The greater Congo shrew (Congosorex polli) is a species of mammal in the family Soricidae. It is endemic to the Democratic Republic of the Congo. Its natural habitat is subtropical or tropical moist lowland forests of the Congo. It is currently losing habitat to deforestation. It eats a wide variety of fruits and a few insects, including ants. It can give birth to around five young.

References

Congosorex
Endemic fauna of the Democratic Republic of the Congo
Taxonomy articles created by Polbot
Mammals described in 1956
Southern Congolian forest–savanna mosaic
Taxa named by Henri Heim de Balsac